The River Tweed is a short tributary of the River Sence. It rises around the west of the village of Barwell, Leicestershire, England and flows westwards, crossing the A447 at Abraham's Bridge.

The Tweed is synonymous with many of the small rivers that rise in West Leicestershire. Starting from a number of small springs, it is not unknown for the river to flood, and as its source is in an urban area the flooding can hit a wide area.

The river meanders gently through the West Leicestershire flood plains, passing near the villages of Dadlington, Shenton, Sibson and to Ratcliffe Culey where it flows into the River Sence and thenceforth into the River Anker, itself a tributary of the River Tame.

At its source a rain drop could fall either side of a hill; on one side it takes a circuitous route via the Tweed, but on the other side it will flow via the River Soar to the Trent, although its eventual route is similar.

References

Tweed
Rivers of Leicestershire
3Tweed